The Miss Ecuador 2005 was on March 12, 2005. There were 16 candidates for the national title. The winner was Ximena Zamora from Pichincha who was crowned by Susana Rivadeneira from Pichincha as Miss Ecuador 2005. She represented Ecuador at Miss Universe 2005.

Results

Placements

Special awards

Contestants

Notes

Returns

Last compete in:

1974:
 Carchi
1999:
 Galápagos

Withdraws

 Azuay
 El Oro
 Esmeraldas
 Imbabura
 Los Ríos

Did not compete

 Guayas - Ana María Sper
 Loja - Paula Espinoza
 Loja - Ivy Seminario

External links
http://www.elmercurio.com.ec/web/titulares.php?seccion=fzuyEtT&codigo=HQ2elBl6dR&nuevo_mes=01&nuevo_ano=2005&dias=10&noticias=2005-01-10
http://www.visitaecuador.com/index.php?hasta=340&codi_seccion=0&cod_seccion=1&codigo=Mgy044Cf
http://www.bellezavenezolana.net/news/2005/marzo/20050316.htm

Miss Ecuador
2005 beauty pageants
Beauty pageants in Ecuador
2005 in Ecuador